Blade is an action game based on the 1998 film of the same name and a prequel to it. It was developed by HammerHead for the PlayStation in 2000, and by HAL Laboratory and Avit Inc. for the Game Boy Color. The game was published by Activision, and follows the adventure of Blade with help of his mentor and friend Abraham Whistler. Reviews were mixed, with criticism of the graphics, camera, controls, and voice acting.

Gameplay
In this game the player takes control of the title character — Blade, as he makes his way through various vampire-infested locations in order to defeat the head vampire menace. As Blade players will venture through warehouses, sewers, museums, city streets, and nightclubs dispatching numerous types of enemies ranging from familiars (humans that do a vampire's bidding), vampires, zombies, monsters, killer dogs, and other creatures of the night. To help Blade with his quest, he has a small arsenal of weapons to arm himself with courtesy of Whistler. Blade always has his trademark sword but can also use his fists as well as a variety of firearms including pistols, shotguns, and machine pistols. Each firearm has three different types of ammunition: standard, explosive, and silver, each with its own effect on different enemies. Blade is also equipped with a "multi-launcher" that can shoot all sorts of things to kill vampires, like silver glaives and UV grenades.

Reception

The PlayStation version of Blade received mixed reviews according to the review aggregation website Metacritic. David Smith of IGN called it "Much too little much too late. There might have been a good game here once, but not anymore." Samuel Bass of NextGen said, "With the actual film available on DVD for half the price, why waste your time with this inferior spin-off?"

The Game Boy version received more positive reviews. Marc Nix of IGN called it "Violent, visceral, bloody action on the Game Boy Color, just how you like it."

See also
 Blade in video games

References

External links
 
 

2000 video games
Action video games
Activision beat 'em ups
Blade (franchise)
Game Boy Color games
Game Boy Color-only games
M-Rated Marvel Comics video games
PlayStation (console) games
PlayStation (console)-only games
Video games about vampires
Video games based on Marvel Comics films
Video games based on films
Video games based on works by David S. Goyer
Video games based on adaptations
Video games developed in Japan
Video games developed in the United Kingdom
Superhero video games
Video games featuring black protagonists
Video game prequels